Atul Moreshwar Save is an Indian politician and member of the Bharatiya Janata Party.       Atul Save won the Aurangabad East Assembly Constituency of Maharashtra Legislative Assembly in the 2014 Maharashtra Legislative Assembly Election.

The Bharatiya Janata Party chose him to lead the party in the Aurangabad Municipal Corporation elections.

Positions held

Ministerial

Legislative

References

Bharatiya Janata Party politicians from Maharashtra
Maharashtra MLAs 2014–2019
Marathi politicians
1965 births
Living people